Herrnstein may refer to:

 Barbara Herrnstein Smith (21st century), American literary critic and theorist
 Richard Herrnstein (1930-1994), Jewish American psychologist
 Albert E. Herrnstein (1882-1958), American football player and coach

See also
 Hernstein, a town in Austria